La Roche-Neuville is a commune in the Mayenne department in north-western France. It was established on 1 January 2019 by merger of the former communes of Loigné-sur-Mayenne (the seat) and Saint-Sulpice.

See also
Communes of the Mayenne department

References

Rocheneuville